El Manaqil (or Al Managil) is a city in Al Jazirah state in the Sudan. Its population as of the controversial 2008 census was 99,775. Some estimates say the population is about 143,000; World Gazetteer estimated it in 2012 at 137,739. Either way it is the second largest city in Al Jazirah state after Wad Medani. It is also the capital of the El Manaqil District (subdivision of the Sudanese states). The city is a retail and services center in the center of the irrigated agricultural region (including cotton, wheat, sorghum).

The town was heavily affected by the 2022 Sudan floods.

Historical populations
 1973 census 15,223
 1983 census 36,090
 1993 census 65,405

References

 :pl:Al-Manakil
 ctv.ca
 http://www.citypopulation.de/Sudan.html
 http://www.statoids.com/ysd.html

Populated places in Al Jazirah (state)